Arcos de las Salinas is a municipality located in the province of Teruel, Aragon, Spain. According to the 2018 census (INE), the municipality had a population of 105 inhabitants.

References

External links
 Arcos de las Salinas

Municipalities in the Province of Teruel